Mattapany-Sewall Archeological Site is an archaeological site in St. Mary's County, Maryland.  It is located at the Patuxent River Naval Air Station on a level terrace approximately 45' above sea level, less than 1000' south of the Patuxent River in an unused wooded/grassy tract. Documentary evidence identifies the site as Mattapany-Sewall, a manor established in 1663 and occupied from 1666 to 1684 by Charles Calvert, 3rd Baron Baltimore.  It served as a governmental meeting place and colonial arsenal, and was the scene of the 1689 battle, known as the Protestant Revolution of 1689, in which Maryland's Proprietary government was overthrown.

It was placed on the National Register of Historic Places in 1985.

References

External links
, including photo in 1982, at Maryland Historical Trust

Archaeological sites on the National Register of Historic Places in Maryland
Archaeological sites in St. Mary's County, Maryland
Historic American Buildings Survey in Maryland
Populated places in colonial Maryland
National Register of Historic Places in St. Mary's County, Maryland